Tuncay Dinç is a Turkish bureaucrat. Former CEO of Borsa Istanbul, Tuncay Dinç was removed from his position on 1 April 2016. His position as Borsa Istanbul CEO was replaced by Himmet Karadağ. He was appointed as Borsa İstanbul CEO to replace Dr. İbrahim M. Turhan, who had previously resigned to run for a seat in the Parliament's 25th term. Dinç is a founding member of Boğaziçi Managers Association, where he also served as Chairman. Dinç speaks English and French and is married with three children.

Career 

After graduating from Galatasaray High School (Lycée de Galatasaray), Tuncay Dinç earned his undergraduate degree from Boğaziçi University in 1997. Dinç started his career at Kibar Holding Budget Planning Department in 1997, and started to work for Lafarge Turkey in 1998. At Lafarge Turkey, Dinç worked in various departments as finance executive until 2003. Between 2003 and 2007, Tuncay Dinç worked for Aveaas Budget & Planning Manager and as Revenue Assurance Manager, which covered the control and surveillance of all revenue-generating processes, development projects and feasibility studies during the Company's partnership with Telecom Italia. Dinç also took part in the merger process of Aycell and Aria as manager. In 2007, Dinç started to work in the airlines catering sector, for Turkish DO&CO, founded jointly by the Turkish Airlines In his CFO and Acting CEO capacity, Dinç ensured the establishment of the Company's financial structure and systems and assumed the responsibility for all procurement activities of the Company. Tuncay Dinç was elected to the vacant Board member position of Borsa İstanbul A.Ş. at the Ordinary General Assembly meeting held on March 31, 2015.

References

Turkish politicians
Living people
Year of birth missing (living people)